Boscia is a genus of plants in the family Capparaceae. It contains the following species:

Boscia albitrunca (Burch) Gilg & Ben.
Boscia angustifolia A. Rich.
Boscia arabica Pestalozii
Boscia caffra Sond.
Boscia coriacea Pax
Boscia corymbosa Gilg
Boscia fadeniorum Fici
Boscia filipes Gilg
Boscia firma Radlk.
Boscia foetida Schinz
Boscia longifolia Hadj-Moust.
Boscia longipedicellata Gilg.
Boscia madagascariensis (DC.) Hadj-Moust.
Boscia microphylla Oliv.
Boscia minimifolia Chiov.
Boscia mossambicensis Klotzsch
Boscia octandra Hochst. ex Radlk.
Boscia oleoides (Burch. ex DC.) Toelken
Boscia pestalozziana Glig
Boscia peuchellii Kuntze
Boscia plantefolii Hadj-Moust.
Boscia polyantha sensu Roessler
Boscia rautanenii Schinz
Boscia rehmanniana Pestal.
Boscia reticulata Hochst. ex A. Rich.
Boscia rotundifolia Pax
Boscia salicifolia Oliv.
Boscia senegalensis (Pers.) Lam. ex Poir.
Boscia tenuifolia A. Chev.
Boscia tomentella Chiov.
Boscia tomentosa Toelken
Boscia transvaalensis Pest.
Boscia weltwitschii Gilg

References
 Missouri Botanical Garden TROPICOS Nomenclatural Database, referenced 30 December 2007 

 
Brassicales genera
Taxonomy articles created by Polbot